Fosheim may refer to:

Fosheim Peninsula, located in western Ellesmere Island, a part of the Qikiqtaaluk Region of the Canadian territory of Nunavut
Lage Fosheim (1958–2013), Norwegian record promoter and musician
Minken Fosheim (1956–2018), Norwegian actress and author